Bentinho Massaro (nicknamed the Tech Bro Guru) is a New Age leader from Amsterdam.

Early life 
Massaro was born in Amsterdam, The Netherlands. He says that he was an intellectually gifted child, describing himself in his early years as "a superhero". He began reading about spirituality at the age of 10 (his parents bought books on the topic and were especially interested in the Silva Method program), including works of Deepak Chopra, ancient scripture, and the philosophy of yoga.

At the age of 18, he visited India. After going back to The Netherlands, he began posting videos online, which gained a significant viewership. In 2011, he spoke at the New Age-affiliated Science and Nonduality Conference. At the age of 25, he moved to Boulder, Colorado.

Views 
Massaro began to promote his New Age spiritual views online from his home in Amsterdam, after returning from India. His views include claims he vibrates at a higher frequency than other humans, that he can build a fully spiritually enlightened society by 2035,. A digital native, Massaro is known for using social media to promote his ideas.

Allegations 
In 2017, Massaro offered a retreat in Sedona, Arizona called "The Sedona Experiment II". During the retreat, an individual died; the Sedona Police Department told Massaro that the death was by suicide.

Testimony from former members 
On February 21, three former followers of Massaro – including a former romantic partner of his – accused him of heading an "abusive cult" that featured a pattern of "psychological and spiritual warfare" and calling him "a predator, hiding in the mask of a messiah". This included being coerced into having sex with Massaro in order to be spiritually cleansed of trauma. Participants are required to sign non-disclosure agreements (NDAs) in order to be part of Massaro's company; Massaro confirmed this, saying he used them "because we have been attacked by frustrated people in the past, and have seen that even the most innocent moment can be twisted to look very bad to the outside world."

References 

1980s births
Living people
Cult leaders
New Age spiritual leaders
People from Amsterdam